Tulmohan Ram was an Indian politician belonging to Indian National Congress. He was a member of the 5th Lok Sabha, representing Araria in Bihar.

During Indira Gandhi’s government in 1974, Ram was indicted in a corruption case relating to issuance of licenses from then Foreign Trade ministry. L.N.Mishra was then the Foreign Trade Minister.

External links 

 
 

People from Bihar
People from Araria
India MPs 1962–1967
India MPs 1967–1970
India MPs 1971–1977
Lok Sabha members from Bihar
Indira Gandhi administration
Indian National Congress politicians
Indian National Congress politicians from Bihar